The Kawasaki Vulcan 500 LTD is a cruiser style beginner motorcycle that was launched in 1990-2009 by Kawasaki Motors. The Vulcan 500 LTD is powered is powered by a parallel twin, 498cc, liquid-cooled, four-stroke, DOHC, eight-valve parallel twin engine. It is based on the Kawasaki Ninja 500 engine. The Vulcan 500 LTD was priced around $5000, placing it under the beginner cruise bike category.

References 

Kawasaki motorcycles